Saint Arthur of Glastonbury (c. 1539), according to some French sources, was an English Catholic in the sixteenth century.  He was martyred during the period of King Henry VIII's suppression of the Catholic Church due to his refusal to accept the king's claim to spiritual leadership of the Church in England.

French Catholic sources lack information on St. Arthur of Glastonbury's martyrdom under Henry VIII.    It is possible that the legendary King Arthur of Camelot, believed to have been connected with Glastonbury, and the story of a local martyr may have been conflated in Breton oral tradition.

There were a number of Catholic martyrs during the English Reformation who hailed from the region including Benedictine priest John Thorne, owner of the original Glastonbury chair, whose name in religion was Arthur. Thorne, Abbot Richard Whyting and fellow priest Roger James, were charged with treason, accused of having hidden the treasures of the Abbey to protect them from confiscation by the Crown. Executed under the tower of a monastery chapel at Glastonbury Abbey, they were beatified in 1895.

St. Arthur's feast-day is celebrated regionally on 15 November in Brittany.

See also

Blessed Arthur Bell Catholic martyr of the English Reformation

Notes

16th-century Christian saints
English saints
English Roman Catholics
People executed under Henry VIII
1539 deaths
Executed English people
16th-century Roman Catholic martyrs
Year of birth unknown
People from Mendip District
Religion in Brittany
Beatifications by Pope Leo XIII